Bilal Sidibé (born December 31, 1978) was a Mauritanian football.

Career
The defender was a member of the Mauritania national team. He scored an own goal for Egypt during the 2008 African Cup of Nations (qualification).

Notes

1978 births
Living people
Mauritania international footballers
Mauritanian expatriate footballers
Mauritanian footballers
Association football defenders
Expatriate footballers in Senegal
Vendée Poiré-sur-Vie Football players
GSI Pontivy players
AS Vitré players
People from Nouakchott
AS Gabès players
Mauritanian expatriate sportspeople in Senegal
Mauritanian expatriate sportspeople in France
Expatriate footballers in France